Cylichneulia is a genus of moths belonging to the family Tortricidae.

Species
Cylichneulia cylichna Razowski, 1994
Cylichneulia telesocia Razowski, 1994

See also
List of Tortricidae genera

References

 , 1994, Shilap Revista de Lepidopterologia 22: 67
 , 2005, World Catalogue of Insects 5

External links
tortricidae.com

Euliini
Tortricidae genera